Scott Harrison (born September 7, 1975) is the founder and current CEO of the non-profit charity: water. Harrison is the author of Thirst: A Story of Redemption, Compassion, and a Mission to Bring Clean Water to the World.

Early life and career
Scott Harrison was born in Philadelphia, Pennsylvania and grew up in Hunterdon County, New Jersey. Harrison began working as a nightclub and party promoter in Manhattan. He spent the next 10 years organizing parties for the likes of MTV, VH1, Bacardi and Elle.  In August 2004, after a shooting at a nightclub he promoted in Uruguay, Harrison quit his job and volunteered as a photojournalist for the Christian charity Mercy Ships, which operates a fleet of hospital ships offering free healthcare, being inspired by his father’s gift of A.W. Tozer’s book, “The Pursuit of God”.

Charity: Water
During his two years with Mercy Ships, Harrison was exposed to the conditions of the impoverished in Liberia. As a response, Harrison founded charity: water in 2006. The charity is a non profit organization that works to bring clean water to people in developing nations through its use of public donations, which directly fund water projects such as building wells and sanitation facilities. While charity:water has claimed to spend 100% of its funding on programming costs, in 2017 Harrison received $325,278 from the organization.

Personal life
Harrison is married to Viktoria Harrison, who was previously involved in design and branding for charity:water. They have two children: a son named Jackson and a daughter named Emma. Harrison is a Christian.

Publications

References

External links
 

Living people
New York University alumni
1975 births
Businesspeople from Philadelphia
Founders of charities
American Christians